Freeland is a Canadian rural community in Prince County, Prince Edward Island.

It is located in the township of Lot 11, north of Ellerslie.

External links
 Government of PEI profile

Communities in Prince County, Prince Edward Island